Government Medical College is a medical institute located in Anantapur, Andhra Pradesh, India. It is affiliated to Dr YSR University of Health Sciences. A Government General Hospital is attached to the medical college. The college and hospital are approved and recognised by the Medical Council of India. The first batch of 100 medical undergraduate students started in 2000. 
Currently Batch of 150 UG-MBBS students has started from academic year 2019-20 onwards .

Government Medical College, Anantapuram also offers 13 Medical Post Graduate Courses :

For More Information : https://mbbscouncil.com/listing/government-medical-college-ananthapuram/

Academics

The main undergraduate course offered at the college is an MBBS (Bachelor of Medicine, Bachelor of Surgery) course. The qualification for undergraduate courses is 10+2 or equivalent education with Biology, physics and chemistry as main subjects. Depending on the rank obtained in the common entrance test [NEET], the N.T.R. University of Health Sciences fills the seats in all the medical, dental, ayurvedic and homeopathy colleges in the state of Andhra pradesh.

Incharge Principal
Dr.Neeraja, Professor of Pathology

References

Medical colleges in Andhra Pradesh
Universities and colleges in Anantapur district
Anantapur, Andhra Pradesh
Educational institutions established in 2000
2000 establishments in Andhra Pradesh